Qaroqazon is a village in Sughd Region, northern Tajikistan. It is part of the jamoat Mehrobod (formerly: Qamishqurghon) in Asht District.

Notes

References

Populated places in Sughd Region